Manjung Power Station is a coal-fired power station in Manjung District, Perak, Malaysia.

See also 
 List of coal power stations

References 

Coal-fired power stations in Malaysia
Manjung District